Peeth may refer to:

Gurudev Siddha Peeth, Indian ashram belonging to the Siddha Yoga organization
Gurukula Vidya Peeth, Indian high school located in Rangareddy, Andhra Pradesh, India
Pitambara Peeth, complex of temples (including an Ashram)
Sharada Peeth, located near Sharda, the famous temple of the goddess Sarasvatī (Sharda) in Northern Kashmir
Tulsi Peeth, Indian religious and social service institution based in Chitrakoot, Madhya Pradesh, India